Hermes is the messenger of the gods in Greek mythology. The masculine given name may also refer to:

Saint Hermes, several Christian martyrs
Hermes Trismegistus ("Hermes the thrice-greatest"), the purported author of the Hermetica|Hermetic Corpus, a series of Egyptian-Greek wisdom texts from the 2nd century AD and later
Hermes L. Ames (1865–1920), New York politician
Hermes Binner (born 1943), Argentine physician and a politician
Hermes da Fonseca (1855–1923), Brazilian soldier and politician, 8th President of Brazil and Minister of War
Hermes Lima (1902–1978), former Prime Minister of Brazil and jurist
Hermes Gamonal (born 1977), Chilean former tennis player
Hermes Neves Soares (born 1974), Brazilian footballer nicknamed Hermes
Hermes Pan (1910–1990), American dancer and choreographer
Hermes Ramírez (born 1948), Cuban retired sprinter

Hermes